Franzmann is a German surname. Notable people with the surname include:

Joelle Franzmann (born 1978), German triathlete
Majella Franzmann
Martin Franzmann (1907–1976), American Lutheran clergyman and theologian
Tobias Franzmann (born 1990), German rower
Vivienne Franzmann (born 1971), English playwright

German-language surnames